Beniamino Iraci (in other sources Benedetto Iraci; born February 3, 1989, in Palermo) is an Italian professional football player.

See also
Football in Italy
List of football clubs in Italy

References

External links
 

1989 births
Living people
Italian footballers
Taranto F.C. 1927 players
Potenza S.C. players
A.S. Noicattaro Calcio players
Association football midfielders